Sierra juniper is a common name for several species of juniper and may refer to:

Juniperus grandis, endemic to the western United States
Juniperus occidentalis, native to the western United States